Braian Gabriel Álvarez (born 22 August 1997) is an Argentine professional footballer who plays as a left midfielder for Ferro Carril Oeste, on loan from Racing Club.

Career
Álvarez made his professional debut in the Argentine Primera División on 27 May 2017, he was substituted on for the final minutes of a 2–1 victory for Racing Club over San Lorenzo. On 13 September, Racing Club allowed Álvarez to join Primera B Nacional's Ferro Carril Oeste on loan. He scored his first career goal in his tenth appearance, netting in an away win against Sarmiento. In total, Álvarez made sixteen appearances for Ferro Carril Oeste. Álvarez was loaned to Primera División side Unión Santa Fe in July 2018. Having spent two years there, Álvarez appeared nine times in all competitions.

Career statistics
.

References

External links

1997 births
Living people
Sportspeople from Mar del Plata
Argentine footballers
Association football midfielders
Argentine Primera División players
Primera Nacional players
Racing Club de Avellaneda footballers
Ferro Carril Oeste footballers
Unión de Santa Fe footballers
Club Agropecuario Argentino players